Zack Greer (born February 12, 1986 in Whitby, Ontario) is a Canadian professional lacrosse player who plays for the Las Vegas Desert Dogs of the National Lacrosse League. Greer attended high school at All Saints Catholic Secondary School in Whitby, and grew up playing box lacrosse.  Greer's brother, Bill, plays for the Toronto Rock in the National Lacrosse League. Greer's cousin Shawn Thornton played in the National Hockey League for 14 seasons from 2002-2017.

Junior career
Greer played junior box lacrosse with the Whitby Warriors of the OLA Junior A Lacrosse League. In 2003, he was awarded the "Joey Nieuwendyk Award" for Rookie of the Year. He was also awarded the "Dean McLeod Award" for Playoffs M.V.P in 2004.

College career

Duke University
In 2007, Zack Greer and his teammate Matt Danowski led the Duke Blue Devils high powered attack to the 2007 NCAA Final Four. Duke faced Johns Hopkins University in the final, only to lose after mounting a strong comeback at the end of the game. In 2008, Greer led Division I in goals scored, helping to lead Duke to the Final Four once again. However, Duke fell short, losing to Johns Hopkins in the semi-finals.

Greer was a four-time All-American including two times on the first team at Duke. Following the 2008 season, Greer was awarded the Jack Turnbull Award given to the USILA Attackman of the year.

Resulting from "unusual circumstance," the NCAA granted 33 Duke Lacrosse players, including Greer, a rare fifth year of eligibility. 
This was granted to many players of the Duke lacrosse team because their season was cancelled in 2006 in mid-season because of the Duke University lacrosse team scandal

Bryant University
Greer used his fifth year of eligibility to pursue a graduate business degree at Bryant University in the fall of 2008 where he played under former Duke head coach, Mike Pressler. In 2009, Bryant University, a former Division II school, played Division I college lacrosse for the first time. At the end of Bryant's 2009 NCAA Division 1 Season, Greer netted 42 Goals and 26 Assists combining for 68 points. Since Bryant was transitioning to Division I that season, Greer's statistics for 2009 do not count toward official NCAA Division I records.

MLL career
The Long Island Lizards selected Greer with the third pick overall in the 2009 MLL draft.

The Long Island Lizards traded Greer in the 2012-2013 offseason to the Denver Outlaws in exchange for Midfielder Collin Briggs.

Greer won a MLL championship with the Denver Outlaws in 2014. Greer was selected by the Rattlers in the fifth round (42nd overall) of the 2018 MLL Supplemental Draft. As of June 18, 2018 he has yet to play a game with them. http://www.dallasrattlers.com

NLL
On September 9, 2009, Greer was drafted 3rd overall in the 2009 NLL entry draft by the Minnesota Swarm.
 Greer finished his rookie season with 10 goals and 23 points.

Statistics

NLL
Reference:

NCAA

(a) 1st in NCAA Men's Division I Career Goals (Greer's career goals of 248 are not officially recognized in the NCAA record books, because Greer was granted a fifth season of eligibility and Bryant was considered a reclassifying institution that season. The NCAA lists Greer's career goals record as 206 goals)
(b) 5th in NCAA Men's Division I Career Points (Greer's career points mark of 353 points is not officially recognized in the NCAA record books, because Greer was granted a fifth season of eligibility and Bryant was considered a reclassifying institution that season. The NCAA lists Greer's official career points as 285 which ranks 17th)

MLL

OLA

See also
Duke Blue Devils men's lacrosse
NCAA Men's Division I Lacrosse Records
MLL and NLL stats via statscrew.com

References

1986 births
Living people
Bryant University alumni
Bryant Bulldogs men's lacrosse players
Canadian lacrosse players
Duke Blue Devils men's lacrosse players
Edmonton Rush players
Lacrosse people from Ontario
Minnesota Swarm players
Saskatchewan Rush players
Sportspeople from Whitby, Ontario